ČEZ Stadion is an indoor sporting arena located in Kladno, Czech Republic. The capacity of the arena is 5,200 people. It is currently home to the Rytíři Kladno ice hockey team.

External links 
 samk.cz
 ČEZ Stadion

Indoor ice hockey venues in the Czech Republic
Sport in Kladno
Sports venues completed in 1949
1949 establishments in Czechoslovakia
20th-century architecture in the Czech Republic